Events from the year 1696 in art.

Events
A sculpture of a walking horse now attributed to Giovanni Francesco Susini (c. 1585 – c. 1653), is sold as a work by Susini's master Giambologna by the art dealer Marcus Forchondt in Antwerp to Prince Johann Adam Andreas I von Liechtenstein.

Paintings

 Gerrit Adriaenszoon Berckheyde – The Market Square at Haarlem with the St. Bavo
 Jacob de Heusch – River View with the Ponte Rotto (Brunswick Gallery, Romer)

Sculptures

Peter Van Dievoet - The White Lamb (Brussels)

Births

 January 5 – Giuseppe Galli Bibiena, Italian designer/painter (died 1757)
 March – Joseph Anton Feuchtmayer, German Rococo stuccoist and sculptor (died 1770)
 March 5 – Giovanni Battista Tiepolo, Italian painter (died 1770)
 March 31 – Mattia Bortoloni, Italian Rococo painter (died 1750)
 date unknown
 Laurent Delvaux, French sculptor (died 1778)
 Kim Du-ryang, Korean genre works painter of the mid Joseon period (died 1763)
 Li Fangying, Chinese painter from Jiangsu (died 1755)
 Francesco de Mura, Italian painter of portraits and frescoes (died 1782)
 August Querfurt, Austrian painter (died 1761)
 Pieter Jan Snyers, Flemish painter (died 1757)
 Jean-Joseph Vinache, French sculptor (died 1754)
 Carlo Zimech, Maltese priest and painter (died 1766)
 probable
 Roland Paradis, silversmith (died 1754)
 1696/1697: Gerard Vandergucht, English born engraver and art dealer (died 1776)

Deaths
 July 22 – Hendrik van Minderhout, Dutch seascape painter (born 1632)
 December 13 – Georg Matthäus Vischer, cartographer, topographer and engraver (born 1628)
 date unknown
 Gian Pietro Bellori, Italian painter, antiquarian and biographer of artists (born 1613)
 Esteban Márquez de Velasco, Spanish Baroque painter (born 1652)
 Charles Philippe Dieussart, Dutch architect and sculptor (born 1625)
 Jean Baptiste Mathey, French architect and painter (born 1630)
 Emilio Taruffi, Italian painter of canvases and altarpieces who was assassinated (born 1633)
 probable
 Dirck Helmbreker, Dutch Baroque painter and draughtsman (born 1633)
 Jacob Huysmans, Flemish portrait painter (born 1633)
 Jan Vermeer van Utrecht, Dutch Golden Age painter (born 1630)

References

 
Years of the 17th century in art
1690s in art